Tongarra is a rural locality located in the Shellharbour LGA, west of Albion Park. It remains untouched from urban development.

References 

City of Shellharbour